Hisato Aikura (相倉久人, 8 December 1931 in Tokyo – 8 July 2015) was a Japanese music critic and jazz presenter. Aikura was known for critics of John Coltrane.

References

Japanese music critics
People from Tokyo
1931 births
2015 deaths